Hendrik Geldenhuys (date of birth March 21, 1983) is a Namibian cricketer.

Geldenhuys was part of the Namibian Under-19s Cricket World Cup squad of January 2002, captained by veteran Stephan Swanepoel. He made five appearances during the tournament, top scoring in the final match he played for the team, with 17 runs.

Geldenhuys was a tailender batsman who bowled infrequently for the young team. He made his first-class debut for Namibia against Free State in February 2008, taking bowling figures of 1/31.

External links 
 

Living people
Namibian cricketers
Year of birth missing (living people)